Malaysian Idol is the Malaysian version of the Idol Series that started in UK, similar to shows such as UK's Pop Idol and American Idol in the franchise. This show is a contest to determine the best young singer in Malaysia, with the winner receiving a major record deal, although some runners-up have achieved enough fame to ink record deals of their own. Like any other Idol show, the winner is decided by public votes. The Malaysian Idol series has gained a following in Malaysia from people of all ages partly due to their interest in American Idol which had been introduced a few years prior. Malaysian Idol has been broadcast to Malaysian viewers via terrestrial television, 8TV and TV3.

The last few finalists of Malaysian Idol have become celebrities because they have their own following of fans who supported them throughout their appearance on Malaysian Idol.

Outside Malaysia, the show has become known worldwide for the audition of a Michael Jackson impersonator, which became a viral hit on the Internet because of his attempt to sing Billie Jean, gaining over 12 million views on YouTube.

Overview 
In Malaysian Idol, auditions were held for the top finalists. 
The first season was hosted by Phat Fabes ("Phat") and Sharifah Aleya. However, for the second season, Jien's new co-host was Cheryl Samad. Malaysian Idol was also unique in presenting in a bilingual English/Malaysian format, Jien representing a large portion of the English dialogue and the Malaysian part primarily Aleya/Samad which would have been of aid to Paul Moss' appearance on the show.

In a nutshell, the Malaysian Idol competition follows the Idol Series' main concept. All rounds of competition are broadcast on television. Contestants who aspire to be singers sign up and audition for the preliminary round in front of three judges (refer Judges below). Successful candidates enter the next round. In the next phase, Idol contestants perform individually and in a group. This round of elimination is also known as the "Theatre Elimination" Round (equivalent to American Idol'''s Hollywood Round) and their fate is again decided by the judges. The last phase involves weekly performances in front of an audience. The person with the fewest votes (as sent in by the audience throughout Malaysia through SMS and telephone calls) for each week, is eliminated. After each performance the judges will give their feedback; however they do not determine whether the contestant should stay or go.  This goes on until the Malaysian Idol has been selected.

 Judges 
As seen in the format for American Idol where there were two American and one British judges, two of the judges in Malaysian Idol were native Malaysians, and the other a New Zealander. Similarly, two out of three of Malaysian Idol judges were male.

The judges included
Roslan Aziz — Malaysian musician, album producer, songwriter. singer
Fauziah Latiff — Malaysian singer, actress
Paul Moss — New Zealand singer, songwriter, producer, recording company Positive Tone's Artiste & Repertoire (A&R) director

 Malaysian Idol Coaches 
Aubrey Suwito - Music Director
Juwita Suwito - Vocal Coach
Michael Xavier Voon & Petra Elaine Pedley- Performance Coaches

 Season 1 (2004)
 
Jaclyn Victor won the title as the first Malaysian Idol in 2004 while the runner-up was Faradina Mohd. Nadzir (Dina).

The Malaysian Idol winner's single is "Gemilang", written by Malaysian Idol music director Aubrey Suwito.

Finalists
(ages stated at time of contest)

Elimination

 	

Season 2 (2005)

After the first selection round (auditions were open to the public throughout Malaysia), and the three Theater Elimination or "workshop" sessions were over, there were 11 finalists left. Every week of Malaysian Idol has resulted in with the contestant with the fewest votes going out of the contest.

Finalists
(ages stated at time of contest)

These finalists released a compilation album entitled Malaysian Idol 2.

Elimination

The winner of 2005 season of Malaysian Idol was Daniel Lee Chee Hun (Daniel) who defeated Norhanita Hamzah (Nita) (Note: Daniel has always been in the top position throughout the weeks leading to the finals, as mentioned occasionally in the show). According to the press conference, Daniel garnered a massive 1.2 million out of 1.67 million votes (or about 68%) by the audience to win the finals (the voting time window was approximately 24 hours after the final show). The final show was on September 23, 2005, and the results show was on September 24, 2005, and held in Genting Highlands's Arena of Stars. On the live broadcast aired on TV3 and 8TV, the three judges spoke highly of both the finalists.

The second season's theme (winner's) song is "Mimpi", written by Pot, a member of the Malaysian band Innuendo. It was also through this song that enabled Daniel to shine in the finals.

 Cancellation 
On 12 March 2006, 8TV's CEO announced that Malaysian Idol would not return for a third season. However, the show was succeeded by One in a Million'' (2006-2009), another reality singing competition that used a similar format.

References

 
Idols (franchise)
Television series by Fremantle (company)
2004 Malaysian television series debuts
2005 Malaysian television series endings
Non-British television series based on British television series
TV3 (Malaysia) original programming
8TV (Malaysian TV network) original programming